is a 1974 Japanese television series. It is the 12th NHK taiga drama.
Tetsuya Watari was forced to step down from the role of Katsu Kaishū because of his illness so he appeared in only the first 9 episodes.

Story
Katsu Kaishū deals with end of the Edo period. Based on Kan Shimozawa's novels "Katsu Kaishū ".

The story chronicles the life of Katsu Kaishū.

Cast

 Tetsuya Watari (ep.1-9) / Hiroki Matsukata (ep.10-) as Katsu Kaishū 
 Onoe Shoroku II : Katsu Kokichi
 Reiko Ohara 
 Yoshiko Kuga : Katsu Nobu
 Mitsuko Oka : Katsu Tami
 Akiko Nishina : Ito
 Naoko Otani : Jun
 Rokkō Toura as Takano Chōei
 Hiroshi Fujioka as Sakamoto Ryoma
 Renji Ishibashi : Yoshida Shōin
 Tōru Emori : Sugi
 Joe Shishido as Yamaoka Tesshū
 Masahiko Tsugawa as Tokugawa Yoshinobu
 Katsumasa Uchida : Imuda Shōhei
 Asao Sano as Tetsugoro
 Takeo Chii : Iwajiro
 Ysohiko Kayama : Fude
 Hideko Yoshida : Oshino
 Etsuko Ichihara : Otose
 Daisuke Katō : Shinmon Tatsugoro
 Daijiro Harada : Chiba Jyutaro
 Tadashi Yokouchi : Hirosawa 
 Toru Abe : Itakura Katsukiyo
 Shōgo Shimada : old guy
 Kōji Nanbara : Mitsukuri Genpo
 Akira Yamauchi : Kozone Kendō
 Yoshio Tsuchiya : Kimurazusho Yoshitake
 Takao Itō : Takechi Hanpeita
 Hisashi Igawa : Matsumoto Ryojun
Tatsuya Fuji as Hijikata Toshizō
Tsunehiko Watase as Tanaka Shinbei
Kenichi Hagiwara as Okada Izo
Keiju Kobayashi : Okubo Tadahiro

References

External links
Taiga drama Katsu Kaishū NHK

1974 Japanese television series debuts
1974 Japanese television series endings
Taiga drama
1970s drama television series
Jidaigeki television series
Cultural depictions of Tokugawa Yoshinobu